The medieval Hogevank Monastery (Armenian: Հոգեվանք; transliterated as Hogevank or Hokevank) is situated near the village of Sarnaghbyur (Սառնաղբյուր), in the Shirak Province of Armenia. It is also known as Karmir vank (Կարմիր վանք) or Dzoragyughi vank (Ձորագյուղի վանք),

Saint Karapet Church (Սբ. Կարապետ), completed in 1205, is the main building in the monastic complex. But, according to an inscription in the upper corner of the northern entrance, the church was initially named Saint Stepanos (Սբ. Ստեփանոս).

The shrine has two entrances: the western and the northern. On the eastern side, there is the semicircular main altar, with arched, exposed vestries placed on each side at a right angle. The dome of the church is in the form of a cylindrical drum. As a result of an earthquake in 1939 the cupola was destroyed; it was restored in 1980. Originally, the church was built of red polished tuff. However, brown and black tuffs were also used during the restoration. There are citations on the outer walls.

Inside the church there exist four-sided carved commemorative markers, made during the 4th and 5th centuries, as well as numerous broken pieces of Khachkar (Armenian cross-stones) from the 13th century. Because of age, the inscriptions on them are illegible.

To the north of Saint Karapet Church, the collapsed walls of a 5th century single nave chapel and a 7th century sanctuary with four apses may be seen.

Gallery

References

Armenian Apostolic monasteries in Armenia
Buildings and structures in Shirak Province